The bayan is a type of chromatic button accordion developed in the Russian Empire in the early 20th century and named after the 11th-century bard Boyan.

Characteristics

The bayan differs from western chromatic button accordions in some details of construction:
 Reeds are broader and rectangular (rather than trapezoidal).
 Reeds are often attached in large groups to a common plate (rather than in pairs); the plates are screwed to the reed block (rather than attached with wax).
 The melody-side keyboard is attached near the middle of the body (rather than at the rear).
 Reeds are generally not tuned with tremolo.
 Register switches may be operated with the chin on some larger models (also possible with some larger European button accordions).
 The diminished chord row is shifted, so that the diminished G chord is where one would expect the diminished C chord in the Stradella bass system.
 Converter switches that go from standard preset chords to free bass (individual bass notes) are common on the larger instruments.  As opposed to Western conventions, in free bass mode the low notes usually are at the bottom of the instrument and the high notes at the top.
 Newer instruments may feature a register where every tone played actually produces a perfect fifth.

The differences in internal construction give the bayan a different tone color from Western instruments, and the bass has a much fuller sound. Because of their range and purity of tone, bayans are often the instrument of choice for accordion virtuosi who perform classical and contemporary classical music. Two Soviet composers of note who wrote compositions for bayan are Vladislav Zolotaryov and Sofia Gubaidulina. Slovak composer Peter Machajdík composed Concerto for two Bayans and Orchestra, which was premiered by Acco Duo (Miran Vaupotić & Ivana Levak-Vaupotić), with the Symphony Orchestra of the Pomeranian Philharmonic under Alexander Gref, at the Paderewski Philharmonic in Bydgoszcz, Poland on 4 June 2009. Russian Bayan virtuoso Stas Venglevski has premiered contemporary works by Yehuda Yannay, Anthony Galla-Rini and William Susman.

See also
 Russian folk music
 Chromatic button accordion

References

Sources
 Cherkaskyi, L. Ukrainski narodni muzychni instrumenty. Tekhnika, Kyiv, Ukraine, 2003. 262 pages. .

External links

 The Classical bayan

Accordion
Ukrainian musical instruments
Russian musical instruments
Russian inventions